Giancarlo Crosta (born 7 August 1934) is an Italian rower who competed in the 1960 Summer Olympics.

He was born in Pianello del Lario.

In 1960 he was a crew member of the Italian boat which won the silver medal in the coxless four event at the 1960 Summer Olympics. At the 1961 European Rowing Championships, he won gold with the coxless four in Prague.

References 

1934 births
Living people
Italian male rowers
Olympic rowers of Italy
Rowers at the 1960 Summer Olympics
Olympic silver medalists for Italy
Sportspeople from the Province of Como
Olympic medalists in rowing
Medalists at the 1960 Summer Olympics
European Rowing Championships medalists